The 1929 Miami Redskins football team was an American football team that represented Miami University as a member of the Buckeye Athletic Association (BAA) during the 1929 college football season. In its sixth season under head coach Chester Pittser, Miami compiled a 7–2 record (3–2 against conference opponents) and finished in third place out of six teams in the BAA.

Schedule

References

Miami
Miami RedHawks football seasons
Miami Redskins football